Lawrence A. Wien, his daughters and their families founded the Mae L. Wien Awards at the School of American Ballet in their mother's name.

Mae L. Wien Faculty Award for Distinguished Service 

Each year a faculty member is honored for distinguished service.  
  
 2019 Phoebe Higgins
 2018 Andrei Kramarevsky
 2017 Arch Higgins
 2016 Jonathan Stafford
 2015 Yvonne Borree 
 2014 Dena Abergel 
 2013 Peter Martins & Kay Mazzo
 2012 Sean Lavery 
 2011 Lisa de Ribère 
 2010 Jeffrey Middleton 
 2009 Violette Verdy 
 2008 Sean Lavery 
 2007 Nikolaj Hübbe 
 2006 Darci Kistler 
 2005 Katrina Killian
 2004 Nathalie Gleboff
 2003 Sheryl Ware
 2002 Jock Soto
 2001 Peter Boal
 2000 Marina Stavitskaya
 1999 Olga Kostritzsky
 1998 Susan Pilarre
 1997 Garielle Whittle 
 1996 Kay Mazzo 
 1995 Andrei Kramarevsky
 1994 Richard Rapp 
 1993 Suki Schorer 
 1992 Stanley Williams
 1991 Elise Reiman
 1990 Hélène Dudin 
 1989 Alexandra Danilova 
 1988 Antonina Tumkovsky 
 1987 Muriel Stuart

Mae L. Wien Awards for Outstanding Promise 

SAB Students are chosen each year on the basis of their outstanding promise.

2019 

 Savannah Durham
 Shelby Tzung
 Cainan Weber

2018 

 Naomi Corti
 Julianne Kinasiewicz
 Davide Riccardo

2017 

 Nieve Corrigan
 Gabriella Domini
 Andres Zuniga

2016 

 Emma Von Enck
 Christopher D’Ariano
 Ethan Fuller

2015  

 Joscelyn Dolson
 Clara Ruf Maldonado
 Dammiel Cruz

2014  

 Lyrica Blankfein
 Christopher Grant
 Baily Jones
 Addie Tapp

2013 

 Daniela Aldrich
 Isabella LaFreniere
 Jordan Miller

2012  

 Olivia Boisson
 Claire Von Enck
 Harrison Coll
 Silas Farley

2011 

 Angelica Generosa
 Meaghan Dutton-O'Hara
 Harrison Ball
 Peter Walker

2010  

 Jillian Harvey
 Alexander Peters
 Spartak Hoxha
 Elizabeth Wallace

2009 

 Emilie Gerrity
 Shoshana Rosenfield
 Ashly Isaacs
 Taylor Stanley

2008 

 Megan Johnson 
 Lydia Wellington
 Sam Greenberg
 Michael Tucker

2007 

 Sara Adams
 Kristen Segin
 Cameron Dieck
 Russell Janzen

2006  

 Kathryn Morgan
 Tabitha Rinko-Gay
 Anthony Huxley
 David Prottas

2005 

 Robert Fairchild
 Maira Barriga
 Jan Burkhard
 Masahiro Suehara

2004 

 Tiler Peck  
 Kaitlyn Gilliland
 Daniel Applebaum
 William Lin-Yee

2003 

 Sara Mearns  
 Giovanni Villalobos
 Ana Sophia Scheller
 Vincent Paradiso

2002 

 Tyler Angle 
 Georgina Pazcoguin
 Allen Peiffer
 Jessica Flynn

2001 

 Megan Fairchild
 Ashlee Knapp
 Benjamin Griffiths
 David Blumenfeld

2000 

 Ashley Bouder
 Amar Ramasar
 Andrew Veyette
 Glenn Keenan

1999 

 Carla Körbes
 Craig Hall
 Seth Orza

1998 

 Janie Taylor
 Adam Hendrickson

1997 

 Stephen Hanna
 Aubrey Morgan

1996 

 Darius Crenshaw
Aesha Ash

1995 

 Jessy Hendrickson 
Benjamin Millepied

1994 

 Seth Belliston
 Kristina Fernandez

1993 

Jennie Somogyi
Edwaard Liang

1992 

 Emily Coates
 Anna Liceica

1991 

 Megan Bonneau
 Sant'gria Bello

1990 

 Samantha Allen
 Elizabeth Walker
 Todd Williams

1989 

 Tanya Gingerich
 Inmaculada Velez
 Arch Higgins
 Jiuchi Kobayashi

1988 

 Gretchen Patchell
 Eric Lindemer
 John Selya

1987 

 Robert Lyon
 Rebecca Metzger

Mae L. Wien Young Choreographer Awards 
Peter Martins may award a third to a young choreographer at his discretion. 

 2001 Melissa Barak 
 1996 Christopher Wheeldon
 1993 Miriam Mahdaviani  
 1991 Robert La Fosse

See also 
List of Janice Levin Award dancers

References

School of American Ballet

New York Times 

Mae L. Wien Awards recipients
List